CIBE-FM is a First Nations community radio station that operates at 90.1 MHz (FM) in Pakuashipi, Quebec, Canada.

The station is owned by Corporation de Radio montagnaise de St-Augustin.

External links

Innu culture
Ibe
Ibe
Year of establishment missing